Perkinsville is a ghost town in Winston County, Mississippi, United States.

A fraternal lodge, No. 331, was located in Perkinsville in 1891.

The population of Perkinsville was 44 in 1900.  The settlement had a post office, as well as "a church and a good school".

All that remains is the Perkinsville Cemetery, located on Perkinsville Road.

References

Former populated places in Winston County, Mississippi
Former populated places in Mississippi